Mart Tarmak (until 1976 Mart Muttikas; born on 10 April 1955 in Tallinn) is an Estonian diplomat and sport personnel.

He graduated from Tallinn 21st Secondary School in 1973 and with a degree in chemistry from University of Tartu in 1978. He later studied Lithuanian and journalism at Vilnius University and Portuguese at the University of Lisbon. Since 1989 he is a member of Estonian Olympic Committee.

Diplomatic posts:
 2006-2010 Ambassador of Estonia in Portugal
 2008-2011 Ambassador of Estonia in Morocco
 2010-2014 Ambassador of Estonia in Finland
 2014-2020 Ambassador of Estonia in Brazil
 2015-2021 Ambassador of Estonia in Peru
 2015-2022 Ambassador of Estonia in Chile
 2017-2021 Ambassador of Estonia in Colombia 

In 2005 he was awarded with Order of the Estonian Red Cross, V class.

References

Living people
1955 births
Estonian diplomats
Ambassadors of Estonia to Portugal
Ambassadors of Estonia to Morocco
Ambassadors of Estonia to Finland
Ambassadors of Estonia to Brazil
Ambassadors of Estonia to Colombia
Ambassadors of Estonia to Peru
Ambassadors of Estonia to Chile
University of Tartu alumni
Vilnius University alumni
University of Lisbon alumni
People from Tallinn